Erich Sack (1 April 1887 – 24 January 1943) was a German Lutheran Pastor and resistance fighter against the Nazis.

Sack was born in Goldap, East Prussia (today Gołdap, Poland) and studied Lutheran theology at the University of Königsberg. He started to work as a Pastor at the Parish of St. Anschar and the „Bethlehem”-hospital in Eppendorf, Hamburg. In 1914 he returned to East Prussia and became a Pastor with the Evangelical State Church of Prussia's older Provinces in Lyck (Ełk). In 1924 he moved to Pillkallen (Dobrovolsk) and in 1927 to Lasdehnen (Krasnoznamensk). After the Nazis took over power in Germany he opposed the Nazi-influenced "German Christians" and joined the Confessing Church. In 1942 he was arrested by the Gestapo, accused of "Weakening the Resistibility of the German people" after Sack had expressed his concerns about the German victory in a confirmees lesson.

Sack died in the Dachau concentration camp on 24 January 1943.

References

1887 births
1943 deaths
People from East Prussia
University of Königsberg alumni
20th-century German Lutheran clergy
German people who died in Dachau concentration camp
German resistance members
People from Gołdap
Resistance members who died in Nazi concentration camps
German civilians killed in World War II